The Gaboon worm lizard (Monopeltis jugularis) is a species of amphisbaenian in the family Amphisbaenidae. The species is native to the west coast of Central Africa.

Geographic range
M. jugularis  is found in Cameroon, Equatorial Guinea, and Gabon.

Habitat
The preferred natural habitat of M. jugularis is forest.

Description

Reproduction
The mode of reproduction of M. jugularis is unknown.

References

Further reading
Boulenger GA (1885). Catalogue of the Lizards in the British Museum (Natural History). Second Edition. Volume II. ... Amphisbænidæ. London: Trustees of the British Museum (Natural History). (Taylor and Francis, printers). xiii + 497 pp. + Plates I–XXIV. (Monopeltis jugularis, p. 459).
Gans C (2005). "Checklist and Bibliography of the Amphisbaenia of the World". Bulletin of the American Museum of Naural History (289): 1–130. (Monopeltis jugularis, p. 36).
Peters W (1880). "Eine Mittheilung über neue oder weniger bekannte Amphibien des Berliner Zoologischens Museums (Leposoma dispar, Monopeltis (Phractogonus) jugularis, Typhlops depressus, Leptocalamus trilineatus, Xenodon punctatus, Elapomorphus erythronotus, Hylomantis fallax)". Monatsberichte der Königlich preussischen Akademie der Wissenschaften zu Berlin 1880: 217–224 + one plate. ("Monopeltis (Phractogonus) jugularis'' ", new species, pp. 219–220 + plate, figure 1, four views). (in German and Latin).

Monopeltis
Lizards of Africa
Reptiles of Cameroon
Reptiles of Equatorial Guinea
Reptiles of Gabon
Reptiles described in 1880
Taxa named by Wilhelm Peters